William Claxton (2 June 1857 – 12 March 1937) was an Australian cricketer. He played two first-class matches for South Australia between 1883 and 1896.

See also
 List of South Australian representative cricketers

References

External links
 

1857 births
1937 deaths
Australian cricketers
South Australia cricketers
Cricketers from Adelaide